Nikolai Nikolaevich Kuznetsov (also
Nikolay Nikolaevich Kuznetsov born 26 December 1994 in Moscow) is a Russian
pianist, the winner of the Grand Prix at the “Monte-Carlo Piano Masters 2021”,  which is held under the patronage of Albert II, Prince of Monaco.

Biography 
Nikolai Kuznetsov was born in Moscow December 26, 1994 in a large family of musicians.
When Nikolai was nine, he entered the Gnessin Moscow
Special School of Music for gifted children (class T.Shklovskaya) and then attended the
Tchaikovsky Moscow State Conservatory (class of prof. Sergei Dorensky), which he graduated with honors in 2021 under professors
Nikolai Lugansky and Andrey Pisarev.

During his studies, Nikolai Kuznetsov became a scholarship holder and participant in concert
programs of the Vladimir Spivakov International Charity Foundation, Yuri Rozum
charitable foundation, the Cultural Development Fund “Return”, the Moscow Public Cultural
Foundation, as well as a scholarship holder of the Helena Roerich Charitable Foundation
 under the program “Support for young talents in the field of science and art”  and an active participant in cultural programs of the
International center Roerichs. The pianist was awarded the “Future of Russia”, also he won
a Grant from the PricewaterhouseCoopers.

From a young age, Nikolai was among the winners of such competitions as
Panama International Piano Competition in Panama City, Golden Ring of Chopin in
Slovenia, Rachmaninov Piano Competition in Frankfurt am Main, “Astana
Piano Passion” in Kazakhstan, “Euregio Piano Award”  in
Germany,
Balakirev Piano Competition in Krasnodar, Canada International Artists Piano
Competition, International Music Competition “e Muse” in Greece, Viseu International
Piano Competition  in Portugal,
“Yamaha Music Award” in Moscow.

In June 2018 Nikolai Kuznetsov became the winner of the XXIII Ricardo Vines International Piano Competition in Spain, the
pianist received the first prize and all the special prizes of the competition.
In September 2019, he was awarded the first prize at the International Piano Competition
“Wandering Music Stars” 
in Tel Aviv. The jury of the competition was headed by Israeli pianist Arie Vardi, also
included other famous musical figures, professors of the world’s leading conservatories:
Dmitri Alexeev, Farhad Badalbeyli, Emanuel Krasovsky, Tomer Lev and others.
In June 2021, Nikolai received the Grand Prix at the International Piano Competition in
Monaco. The jury of the competition was headed by pianist Barry
Douglas. The award ceremony took place at the Opéra de Monte-Carlo, where the
pianist was awarded the Prize of Prince Rainier III, from the
hands of His Highness Albert II, Prince of Monaco. 
He has collaborated with
such orchestras as Monte-Carlo Philharmonic Orchestra, Jerusalem Symphony Orchestra, Dallas Symphony Orchestra, State Academic Symphony Orchestra of the Russian Federation, Mariinsky Theatre Orchestra, Moscow State Symphony Orchestra, State Symphony Capella of Russia, Oman Symphony Orchestra, l'Orchestre Symphonique du CRR de Paris, Academic Symphony Orchestra of the Kharkiv Philharmonic, Ural Philharmonic Orchestra, State Hermitage Orchestra, State Academic Chamber Orchestra of Russia,
Symphony Orchestra of the Primorsky Opera and Ballet Theater, Academic Symphony
Orchestra of the Samara State Philharmonic.

Nikolai has also performed at international music festivals including
“Outstanding Pianists of the XXI century”  in Bogota
(Colombia),
International Music Festival in Kyoto (Japan),
International Beethoven Music Festival (Germany),
International Piano Festival “Pianissimo”  in the Hermitage Museum, St. Petersburg, (Russia),
International Music Festival in Deia (Spain,
Majorca),
International Piano Festival in Bucaramanga (Colombia),
“Music — our Common Home” in Kharkiv (Ukraine),
“European Concerts in St. Petersburg”  (Russia),
“Primorsky Key”  in Vladivostok (Russia).
He took part at the jubilee music marathon dedicated to the 200th anniversary of the birth of
Franz Liszt and musical festival dedicated to the 250th anniversary of the birth of Ludwig van Beethoven in Moscow (Great
Hall of Conservatory), also he has repeatedly participated in the
musical project “Giovani Talenti Russi”  in Italy.
He has toured with recitals in cities of Russia, Spain, Italy, Estonia, Ukraine, Germany, France, Monaco, Slovenia, Japan, Oman and South American countries.

References

External links 
Official website

Living people
1994 births
21st-century classical pianists
21st-century male musicians
Male classical pianists
21st-century Russian male musicians
Russian classical pianists